William Jack Scott (December 20, 1928 – December 3, 2014) was an American football and basketball coach.  He served as the head football coach at Westmar College—later known as Westmar University—in Le Mars, Iowa from 1961 to 1969 and Eastern New Mexico University in Portales, New Mexico from 1970 to 1977, compiling a career college football coaching record of 100–58–5.

Coaching career
Scott began his coaching career at the high school level at Willow Lake, South Dakota.  His high school teams had a two-year 18–1–1 record in football and a 52–30 record in basketball.

Westmar
From 1961 to 1969 he was head football coach at Westmar College in Le Mars, Iowa where he compiled a 60–17–3 record. His 1968 team was undefeated. He won five consecutive conference championships and remains the winningest football coach in Westmar history.  The Iowa United Methodist Foundation maintains a scholarship in his name to this day.

Eastern New Mexico
Scott was the ninth head football coach for Eastern New Mexico University in Portales, New Mexico and he held that position for eight seasons, from 1970 until 1977.  His overall coaching record at Eastern New Mexico was 40–41–2.  In 2008, he was one of several honorees awarded "The Distinguished Faculty Emeriti" award by The Friends of Eastern Foundation.

Other information
Scott attended Dana College. He played professional baseball briefly, in 1950 for the Geneva Red Birds. He died at 85 years old in 2014.

Head coaching record

College football

References

External links
 

1928 births
2014 deaths
Dana College alumni
Eastern New Mexico Greyhounds football coaches
Eastern New Mexico University faculty
Edmonton Elks coaches
Geneva Red Birds players
Graceland Yellowjackets football players
Westmar Eagles football coaches
High school basketball coaches in South Dakota
High school football coaches in South Dakota
People from Clark County, South Dakota
People from Le Mars, Iowa
Sportspeople from Omaha, Nebraska